The Lookout is a 2007 American crime film written and directed by Scott Frank, in his directorial debut, and starring Joseph Gordon-Levitt, Jeff Daniels, Matthew Goode, Bruce McGill, and Isla Fisher.

Plot
Driving at night with his lights off, high school sports star Chris Pratt crashes into a combine stalled on the road. Two of his passengers are killed, while he and his girlfriend Kelly survive. The crash leaves Chris with lasting mental impairments, including anterograde amnesia and anger management issues.

Four years later, Chris takes classes to learn new skills, including the simple sequencing of daily tasks to compensate for his inability to remember, and keeps notes to himself in a small notebook. Challenged by a tough case manager to build a life despite his injuries, he is emotionally supported by his roommate, a blind man named Lewis, but receives only financial support from his wealthy family. Chris works nights cleaning a small-town bank, and his only friend besides Lewis is Ted, a Sheriff's Deputy who checks in on Chris regularly. Chris repeatedly tries to convince the bank's manager, Mr. Tuttle, to allow him to apply for a teller job, to no avail.

Chris comes under the scrutiny of a gang planning to rob the bank. Their leader Gary, who knew Chris from high school and resented his wealth and popularity before his accident, befriends him and uses a young woman, Luvlee Lemons, to seduce him. Taunted by the gang about his limitations since the accident, Chris initially goes along with their scheme. His frustrations trickle down into confrontations with Lewis and Ted.

When the gang arrives the night of the robbery, Chris tells them he has changed his mind, but is forced to empty the vault at gunpoint. Bringing Chris doughnuts, Ted stumbles upon the robbery. Realizing they've been discovered, one of the robbers, Bone, begins shooting. Ted kills two of the robbers, Marty and Cork, and seriously wounds Gary before Bone maneuvers around and shoots Ted in the back, executing him with a second shot. Escaping in the getaway car, Chris realizes he has the stolen money, and is compelled to return to the site of his accident, where he buries the money. Gary, seriously wounded, escapes with Bone. Returning to his apartment, Chris sees the lights on and realizes something is wrong. He calls and learns Gary and Bone have taken Lewis hostage to get the money back. Chris, using his new sequencing skills, hatches a plan to stay alive and save his friend, but the robbers catch him napping at the arranged meeting place and force him to take them to the buried cash.

While Chris digs in the snow for the money, Gary's condition deteriorates. Chris gives one of the two bags to Bone, who is preparing to execute Lewis, but Chris kills Bone with the shotgun stashed in the other bag. Gary collapses and dies. Chris returns the money and turns himself in, but the FBI investigation concludes that he was not responsible due to his mental condition and, because the robbers failed to disconnect the video surveillance, the FBI was able to see Chris was forced to act at gunpoint.

Chris and Lewis reconcile and open a restaurant together with a loan from the bank. Chris hopes Kelly will forgive him for the loss of her leg in the accident and that one day he will find the courage to talk to her again.

Cast

Production
Although set near Kansas City, Missouri, the bank in the movie was filmed in the town of Hartney, Manitoba, using the town's Museum, and city scenes were filmed in Winnipeg, Manitoba. Scenes of the skating rink were filmed behind the Millennium Library, and the exterior of Chris's apartment was filmed in the Exchange District and various historic sites in Winnipeg including the Bank of Montreal (1911–13), the Ambassador Apartments (1909), the interior of the Market Building (1899) and the James Ashdown House at 529 Wellington (1913). The Ambassador Apartments appear on the film's poster.

Reception
The Lookout received critical acclaim. The film has an aggregated score of 87% at Rotten Tomatoes based on 169 reviews. The critical consensus reads, "The Lookout is a genuinely suspenseful and affecting noir due to the great ensemble cast and their complex, realistic characters." On Metacritic, the film has a score 73 out of 100 based on 33 reviews, indicating "generally favorable reviews." Particularly favorable reviews came from Richard Roeper and Leonard Maltin, with the latter praising the film as "the best movie so far" of the first half of 2007.

The Lookout won the award for Best First Feature at the 2008 Independent Spirit Awards.

Soundtrack
The score was composed by James Newton Howard and was his first collaboration with director Scott Frank. Frequent collaborators Stuart Michael Thomas and Clay Duncan are credited with additional music. The score was orchestrated by Brad Dechter, Stuart Michael Thomas, and Chris P. Bacon, who also conducted. Several songs were featured including "One Big Holiday" and "Lay Low", both performed by My Morning Jacket.

References

External links
 
 
 
 
 Production notes at Made in Atlantis

2007 films
2007 crime drama films
2007 crime thriller films
2007 directorial debut films
2007 independent films
2007 psychological thriller films
American crime drama films
American crime thriller films
American heist films
Films about amnesia
Films directed by Scott Frank
Films produced by Roger Birnbaum
Films produced by Laurence Mark
Films produced by Walter F. Parkes
Films scored by James Newton Howard
Films set in Kansas
Films shot in Winnipeg
Films with screenplays by Scott Frank
Miramax films
Spyglass Entertainment films
2000s English-language films
2000s American films